Ernie Brooks may refer to:

 Ernest Brooks (rugby league) (1884–1940), English rugby league footballer
 Ernie Brooks (footballer) (1892–1975), English footballer
 Ernie Brooks (musician), bassist with The Modern Lovers